Angelica triquinata, known by the common name of filmy angelica, is a member of the carrot family, Apiaceae. It is a perennial herb, native to the Appalachian Mountains in the eastern United States, from Georgia to Pennsylvania.

References

External links

triquinata
Flora of Georgia (U.S. state)
Flora of South Carolina
Flora of Tennessee
Flora of North Carolina
Flora of Kentucky
Flora of West Virginia
Flora of Virginia
Flora of Maryland
Flora of Pennsylvania
Plants described in 1803